Bernard Vaussion (born 24 October 1953) is a French chef. He is the chef for the President of France. Vaussion started as executive chef in 2005.

As chef to a head of state, Vaussion is a member of Le Club des Chefs des Chefs.

References

1953 births
Living people
French chefs